Jacqueline Couti is the Laurence H. Favrot Associate Professor of French Studies and Associate Director of the Center for the Study of Women, Gender, and Sexuality at Rice University.

Education 
Dr. Couti received her MA in 2004, and her PhD in 2008 from the University of Virginia in French Language and Literatures with a specialization in Francophone and New World Studies.

Career 
Dr. Couti came to Rice University's Department of Classical and European Studies, which is now the Department of Modern and Classical Literatures and Cultures, in 2018. In 2019, Dr. Couti organized a three-day international symposium on black feminism entitled Can We Talk About Black Feminisms in a French (Post-)imperial Context? In the spring of 2020 Dr. Couti was awarded a Conference and Workshop Development Fund grant for In the Path of Disaster(s) with Luis Duno-Gottberg, as well as a Scholarly and Creative Works Subvention Fund grant for Sex, Sea, and Self: Nationalism and Sexuality in French Caribbean Discourses, 1924-1948.

Dr. Couti joined the Department of Modern and Classical Languages, Literatures, and Cultures at the University of Kentucky in 2010 as an associate professor of French and Francophone Studies. While there, she also taught in Gender and Women Studies as well as African-American and Africana Studies, and served as an advisor for the Caribbean Student Association. Dr. Couti, who is a native of Martinique, was the first scholar given access to Aimé Césaire's home office documents when she conducted a research trip in 2010 in preparation for a critical edition on the Martinican politician and poet.

Awards 

 2013-2014 College of Arts & Sciences Outstanding Teaching Award, University of Kentucky
 2016 College of Arts and Sciences Outstanding Teaching Awards: Award for Diversity and Inclusion, University of Kentucky

Bibliography 

 Dangerous Creole Liaisons: Sexuality and Nationalism in French Caribbean Discourses from 1806 to 1897 (Liverpool University Press, 2016)
 ed. Afroféminisme (Essays in French Literature and Culture, 2019)
 Sex, Sea, and Self: Sexuality and Nationalism in French Caribbean Discourses 1924-1948 (Liverpool University Press, forthcoming in 2021)

References 

African-American women academics
American women academics
African-American academics
Rice University faculty
University of Virginia alumni
Living people
Year of birth missing (living people)
21st-century African-American people
21st-century African-American women